"The Arkansas Traveler" is a mid-19th century folk song popularized by American singer and guitarist Mose Case. It is based on the composition of the same name by Sandford C. Faulkner. The score was first published by W. C. Peters in 1847 under the name "The Arkansas Traveller and Rackinsac Waltz".

It was Arkansas' state song from 1949 to 1963, and the state historic song since 1987. The official lyrics were written by a committee in 1947 in preparation for its naming as the official state song. The other official Arkansas state songs are "Arkansas" (state anthem), "Arkansas (You Run Deep In Me)," and "Oh, Arkansas."

The song's earliest known recording was by Kentucky fiddler Don Richardson for Columbia in April 1916. The 1922 version by native-Arkansan “Eck” Robertson was among the first fifty recordings named to the National Recording Registry of the Library of Congress. An even earlier rendition, a recitation of the story by Len Spencer with accompaniment by an unknown fiddler, was recorded by the Zonophone label prior to May 1902.

Background
The song is traditionally known to have had several versions of lyrics, which are much older than Arkansas' copyrighted state historic song.

Other versions

State historic song
Composed by the Arkansas State Song Selection Committee in 1947.
Far and far away down in Arkansas,
There lived a squatter with a stubborn jaw.
His nose was ruby red and his whiskers gray.
And he would sit and fiddle all the night and all the day.
Came a traveler down the valley, asked if he could find a bed.
Yes, try the road, the kindly squatter said.
Then, could you point me out the way to find a tavern or an Inn?
Quite a little piece I reckon, tho I've never been!

And, when the rain came down on the cabin floor,
The squatter only fiddled all the more.
Why don't you mend your roof, said the traveler bold.
How can I mend my cabin when the rain is wet and cold?
Squatter pick a sunny morning when the air is dry and nice,
Patch up your cabin, that is my advice.
The squatter shook his hoary head, and answered with a stubborn air,
Cabin never leaks a drop when days are bright and fair!

Peter Pan version
Oh, once upon a time in Arkansas,
An old man sat in his little cabin door
And fiddled at a tune that he liked to hear,
A jolly old tune that he played by ear.
It was raining hard, but the fiddler didn't care,
He sawed away at the popular air,
Tho' his rooftree leaked like a waterfall,
That didn't seem to bother the man at all.

A traveler was riding by that day,
And stopped to hear him a-practicing away;
The cabin was a-float and his feet were wet,
But still the old man didn't seem to fret.
So the stranger said "Now the way it seems to me,
You'd better mend your roof," said he.
But the old man said as he played away,
"I couldn't mend it now, it's a rainy day."

The traveler replied, "That's all quite true,
But this, I think, is the thing to do;
Get busy on a day that is fair and bright,
Then patch the old roof till it's good and tight."
But the old man kept on a-playing at his reel,
And tapped the ground with his leathery heel.
"Get along," said he, "for you give me a pain;
My cabin never leaks when it doesn't rain."

Albert Bigelow Paine's 1st version
from The Arkansaw Bear: A Tale of Fanciful Adventure. The second version is the original version. The first version is the version taught to Northern school Children.
Oh, 'twas down in the woods of the Arkansaw,
And the night was cloudy and the wind was raw,
And he didn't have a bed, and he didn't have a bite,
And if he hadn't fiddled, he'd a travelled all night.

But he came to a cabin, and an old gray man,
And says he, "Where am I going? Now tell me if you can."

"Oh, we'll have a little music first and then some supper, too,
But before we have the supper we will play the music through.
You'll forget about your supper, you'll forget about your home,
You'll forget you ever started out in Arkansaw to roam."

Now the old man sat a-fiddling by the little cabin door,
And the tune was pretty lively, and he played it o'er and o'er,
And the stranger sat a-list'ning and a-wond'ring what to do,
As he fiddled and he fiddled, but he never played it through.

Then the stranger asked the fiddler, "Won't you play the rest for me?"
"Don't know it," says the fiddler. "Play it for yourself!" says he.

Then the stranger took the fiddle, with a riddy-diddle-diddle,
And the strings began to tingle at the jingle of the bow,
While the old man sat and listened, and his eyes with pleasure glistened,
As he shouted, "Hallelujah! And hurray for Joe!"

Albert Bigelow Paine's 2nd version
Oh, there was a little boy and his name was Bo,
Went out into the woods when the moon was low,
And he met an old bear who was hungry for a snack,
And his folks are still a-waiting for Bosephus to come back.

For the boy became the teacher of this kind and gentle creature
Who can play upon the fiddle in a very skillful way.
And they'll never, ever sever, and they'll travel on forever,
Bosephus and the fiddle and the old black bear.

Traditional children's version
I'm bringin' home a baby bumblebee   
Won't my mommy be so proud of me
I'm bringin' home a baby bumblebee—Ow! It stung me!

I'm  up my baby bumblebee
Won't my mommy be so proud of me
I'm  up my baby bumblebee-Yuck! It's dirty!

I'm lickin' up my baby bumble bee
Won't my mommy be so proud of me
I'm lickin' up my baby bumble bee-Ick! I feel sick!

I'm  up my baby bumble bee
Won't my mommy be so proud of me
I'm  up my baby bumble bee-Oh! What a mess!

I'm wipin' up my baby bumble bee
Won't my mommy be so proud of me
I'm wipin' up my baby bumble bee-Oops! Mommy's new towel!

I'm wringin' out my baby bumble bee
Won't my mommy be so proud of me
I'm wringin' out my baby bumble bee-Bye-bye baby bumblebee!

Alternate Children's version
I'm bringin' home a baby bumblebee   
Won't my mommy be so proud of me
I'm bringin' home a baby bumblebee—Ow! He stung me!

I'm bringin' home my baby dinosaur
Won't my mommy kick him out the door?
I'm bringin' home my baby dinosaur-Ouch! He kicked me!

I'm bringin' home my baby hippopotamus
Won't my mommy fuss, and fuss, and fuss?

I'm bringin' home my baby hippopotamus-Ouch! He swallowed me!

Uses in film

"The Arkansas Traveler" was frequently featured in animated cartoons in the 1930s and 1940s, most prolifically by Carl Stalling in music he composed for the Merrie Melodies and Looney Tunes series. It usually was played, sloppily, when a yokel, hillbilly, or "country bumpkin" character would appear on screen. A slow version of the "Bringing home a baby bumble-bee" version is sung by Beaky Buzzard in the short The Bashful Buzzard.

The popularity and joyfulness of "The Arkansas Traveler" was attested to in the 1932 Academy Award-winning Laurel and Hardy short, The Music Box. In this film, the boys labored to haul a player piano up a long flight of stairs and into a house through a bedroom window. Near the conclusion of their adventure, as they are starting to clean up their mess surrounding the newly installed piano, Stan and Ollie play a roll of "Patriotic Melodies". They dance with much grace and amusement to "The Arkansas Traveler", followed briefly by "Dixie". Marvin Hatley, who composed Laurel and Hardy's "Cuckoo" theme song, was the pianist for this sequence; the player piano was not real.

Vaudeville
"The Arkansas Traveler" was a popular comedy sketch on the vaudeville circuit. It revolved around the encounter of a (usually lost) traveling city person with a local, wise-cracking fiddle player. Various jokes at the expense of the "city slicker" were interspersed with instrumental versions of the song. In many versions, the city person is also a fiddle player, and as the sketch progresses, eventually learns the tune and plays along with the country bumpkin.

The contemporary singer Michelle Shocked includes a vaudeville-style version of "Arkansas Traveler" on her 1992 album of the same name.  Jerry Garcia and David Grisman also do a version on their 1993 album Not for Kids Only.

In other media

Dan Hornsby's Original Arkansas Traveler Part 1 (with Clayton McMichen, Columbia 15253D) - 1920s version for Columbia Records, and Original Arkansas Traveler Part 2 (with Clayton McMichen, Columbia 15253D)

Charles Ives uses the tune in his theater orchestra piece called "Country Band" March.

Eck Robertson and Henry C. Gilliland's 1922 recording of "Arkansaw Traveler" [sic] (Victor 18956) was selected for the 2002 National Recording Registry.

The song is the centerpiece of The Legend of the Arkansas Traveler, a short "Concert Paraphrase on an Old American Fiddle Tune" for orchestra composed by Harl McDonald in 1939.

Children's entertainer Raffi used the melody of "The Arkansas Traveler" for the song "Peanut Butter Sandwich," which appears on his album Singable Songs for the Very Young.

The "Baby Bumblebee" version was sung on two episodes of Barney & Friends, and one video from its predecessor, Barney and the Backyard Gang.

Pete Seeger recorded the vaudeville version of "Arkansas Traveler" for his 1954 album "Frontier Ballads"

The Jukebox Band perform their version of this song in a Shining Time Station episode, Win, Lose or Draw.

In Red Dead Redemption 2, the saloon piano players often play the song in the lineup of Western piano music.

The instrumental version is heard in the dance scene in the 12th episode of Call of the Wild.

The instrumental versions are used as the cultural theme songs for the United States in the video game series Civilization.

See also 
 List of U.S. state songs

References

Further reading

External links

 

1862 compositions
1862 songs
1924 singles
American folk songs
Arkansas folklore
Music of Arkansas
Sandford C. Faulkner
Songs about Arkansas
Songs about fiddles
Symbols of Arkansas
United States National Recording Registry recordings
United States state songs